Alvin James is a retired Jamaican-American soccer midfielder who played professionally in the American Professional Soccer League and National Professional Soccer League.  He coaches youth soccer in South Florida.

Youth
Born in Jamaica, James moved to South Florida with his family as a young boy.  He grew up playing soccer with the U-19 Lauderhill Lions FC winning 2 State Championships in 1984 and 1985.  In 1985, James graduated from Boyd Anderson High School.  He attended UNC-Greensboro, playing on the Spartans 1985 and 1986 NCAA Men's Division III Soccer National Championship Team.  He transferred to Florida International University where he completed his collegiate career with the Golden Panthers in 1987 and 1988 and graduated with a degree in Economics. James later went on to sign with the Ft. Lauderdale Strikers professional soccer team winning a National Championship in 1989.

Professional
In 1989, James turned professional when he signed with the Fort Lauderdale Strikers of the American Soccer League.  That season, the Strikers won the league championship.  James played for the Strikers in 1990 and 1991.  On October 31, 1991, James signed with the Illinois Thunder of the National Professional Soccer League, but tore the anterior cruciate ligament in his right knee in February 1992.  He had reconstructive surgery on May 19, 1992, and lost the entire 1992 outdoor season.  He came back and played for the Strikers in 1993.

Coach
James coached for the Weston Soccer Club from 1999- 2011 winning 4 State Championships for the Club putting them on the map as a viable and competitive club Nationally. The club was then awarded Academy Status where he coached the 1993/1994 U-16 squad.
Many players under James garnered athletic scholarships most notable where Alejandro Bedoya, Scotty Campbell, and Jean Alexander. James then went on to coach American Heritage School (Delray Beach, Florida) winning another 3 State Championships. He left Weston FC and coached at West Pines United for 2 years from 2011-2013 before starting and becoming the DOC of his own club, Miramar United Elite FC in Miramar Florida in 2013.

References

Living people
American soccer coaches
American soccer players
American Soccer League (1988–89) players
American Professional Soccer League players
FIU Panthers men's soccer players
Fort Lauderdale Strikers (1988–1994) players
Illinois Thunder players
National Professional Soccer League (1984–2001) players
UNC Greensboro Spartans men's soccer players
Association football forwards
Association football midfielders
Year of birth missing (living people)
Soccer players from Florida
Sportspeople from Broward County, Florida
High school soccer coaches in the United States